James Lee Turner (born June 15, 1959) was an American football defensive back who played five seasons in the National Football League with the Cincinnati Bengals and Atlanta Falcons. He was drafted by the Cincinnati Bengals in the third round of the 1983 NFL Draft. He played college football at the University of California, Los Angeles and attended Sherman High School in Sherman, Texas.

References

External links
Just Sports Stats

Living people
1959 births
Players of American football from Texas
American football defensive backs
Sherman High School (Texas) alumni
UCLA Bruins football players
Cincinnati Bengals players
Atlanta Falcons players
People from Sherman, Texas